Fetor (occasionally foetor) refers to a foul or unpleasant odor emanating from an individual.

Specific types include:
 fetor oris, another term for halitosis
 fetor hepaticus
 uremic fetor
 body odor
 rectal fetor

References

External links 

Olfaction